"" ("The moonlit evening") is a poem by , who published his poetry under the pseudonym Ermin in , a periodical he had founded in 1811.

In 1815 Franz Schubert set "Der Mondabend" for voice and piano. It was first published in 1830 in Vienna, as No. 1 of Op. posth. 131. Later the song was known as  141. The only other poem by Kumpf that was set by Schubert was "", D 305.

"Der Mondabend", WAB 200, is a reminiscence – in the same key (A major), meter and first four notes – of Schubert's "Der Mondabend", that Anton Bruckner composed for Aloisia Bogner .

References

External links
 "Der Mondabend" at 
 "Der Mondabend", text and translations at The LiederNet Archive website
 

Lieder composed by Franz Schubert
1815 songs